Zindagi Abhi Baaki Hai Mere Ghost ( Life is still remaining my ghost) is an Indian horror comedy television series, which premiered on 31 August 2015  on Life OK. The series is produced by Ravi Ojha Productions of Ravi Ojha. The storyline of the series revolves around a family of ghosts haunting a deserted house in Goa. Dhruv Raj Sharma and Kanika Kotnala have lead roles in the series.

Story 
A poor fisherman named Yug, forced to take shelter in an old mansion, encounters a family of ghosts. Terrified at first, he slowly gets to know them and later befriends them. The ghost family in Palekar mansion was stuck because of the person who killed them mysteriously and they can't get peace unless they punish the culprit. Yug becomes a family member to the ghost family because of his selflessness and soft heart. An orphan gets a beautiful family.
Yug is in love with Sophia, daughter of Mr. D'costa (very reputed and richest man of Bastura) and the ghost family have misconception in their mind of being killed by D'costa but afterwards it is revealed that it was a minister named Kishore Kadam who changed his identity by plastic surgery and known as Keith Adams. Sophia's step mother is also his partner in crime but by the time the ghost family confronted this truth Dsouza died because of Kishore's controversies.
Sophia felt in love with Yug while solving Dsouza's murder mystery along with Palekar's murder mystery (Ghost Family).
Finally, when ghost family got their culprit and punished him by killing so after that they got peace (mukti).

Cast 
 Dhruv Raj Sharma as Yug Bastora
 Kanika Kotnala as Sophia D'costa
 Smita Bansal  as Radha Palekar
 Ayesha Singh as Amy D'costa 
 Indraneel Bhattacharya as Suraj Palekar
 Shweta Vyas as Riya Palekar
 Anant V Joshi as Ishaan Palekar
 Tiku Talsania as Peter D'costa
 Ayub Khan as Keith Adams
 Anita Kanwal as Dadi Ghost 
 Tanaaz Irani as Veronica D'costa
 Anshuman sinha as Benjamin
 Rishi Khurana as Jaggu

References

External links
 Zindagi Abhi Baki Hai Mere Ghost on hotstar

2015 Indian television series debuts
Hindi-language television shows
Indian comedy television series
Indian horror fiction television series
Life OK original programming
Horror comedy television series
Ghosts in television